Puntioplites proctozystron, Smith's Barb or Pla Mang is a species of ray-finned fish in the genus Puntioplites.

Footnotes

Proctozystron
Fish described in 1865